Ziziphus robertsoniana is a species of plant in the family Rhamnaceae. It is found primarily in Kwale, on the southern coast of Kenya, and may also be found in Tanzania. It is threatened by habitat loss.

It was described in 1996 by Henk Jaap Beentje, after having been collected by Mrs. Ann Robertson from Malindi, Kenya, in 1983.

References

robertsoniana
Flora of Kenya
Flora of Tanzania
Trees of Africa
Endangered plants
Taxonomy articles created by Polbot
Taxa named by Henk Jaap Beentje